Hrafn is both a masculine byname, and personal name in Old Norse. The name translates into English as "raven". The Old English form of the name is *Hræfn. The name is paralleled by the English masculine given name Raven, which is derived from the word "raven".

People with the name
Hrafn Haengsson, (fl. 10th century), Icelandic jurist and goði
 Hrafn Gunnlaugsson, (born 1948), Icelandic moviemaker
 Hrafna-Flóki Vilgerðarson (born 9th century), first Norseman to deliberately sail to Iceland
 Einar Hrafn Stefánsson, member of an Icelandic musical group Hatari
 Hrafna, Icelandic youtuber

References

Masculine given names
Icelandic masculine given names
Old Norse personal names
Birds in culture